Wildlife species may refer to:
A taxonomic species found in the wild
Evolutionarily Significant Unit, a grouping used in conservation that may refer to species, subspecies, or other groups